The Spirit of Haida Gwaii is a sculpture by British Columbia Haida artist Bill Reid (1920–1998). There are two versions of it: the black canoe and the jade canoe. The black canoe features on Canadian $20 bills of the Canadian Journey series issued between 2004 and 2012.

Background

The sculpture was originally created in 1986 as a -scale clay model, enlarged in 1988, to full-size clay. In 1991, the model was cast in bronze.  This first bronze casting was entitled The Spirit of Haida Gwaii, the Black Canoe and is now displayed outside the Canadian Embassy in Washington, D.C.  The second bronze casting, entitled The Spirit of Haida Gwaii, the Jade Canoe, was first displayed at the Canadian Museum of History in 1994. Finally, in 1996, the Jade Canoe (as it is generally called) was moved to the International Terminal at Vancouver International Airport.

The original plaster pattern for the sculpture is on display in the main hall of the Canadian Museum of History.

On 30 April 1996 Canada Post issued The Spirit of Haida Gwaii, 1986–1991, Bill Reid in the Masterpieces of Canadian art series. The stamp was designed by Pierre-Yves Pelletier based on a sculpture The Spirit of Haida Gwaii (1991) by William Ronald Reid in the Canadian Embassy, Washington, United States. The 90¢ stamps are perforated 12.5 mm × 13 mm and were printed by Ashton-Potter Limited.

An image of the sculpture features prominently on the reverse of the 2004 edition of the Canadian twenty-dollar bill. These bills are no longer issued; a new design entered use in 2012.

Sculpture

The Spirit of Haida Gwaii is intended to represent the Aboriginal heritage of Haida Gwaii, formerly called the Queen Charlotte Islands. In green-coloured bronze on the Vancouver version and black-coloured on the Washington version, it shows a traditional Haida cedar dugout canoe which totals six metres in length.
Consistent with Haida tradition, the significance of the passengers is highly symbolic.  The variety and interdependence of the canoe's occupants represents the natural environment on which the ancient Haida relied for their very survival: the passengers are diverse, and not always in harmony, yet they must depend on one another to live. The fact that the cunning trickster, Raven, holds the steering oar is likely symbolic of nature's unpredictability.

References

External links

Vancouver International Airport: The Spirit of Haida Gwaii page
Foreign Affairs Canada: The Spirit of Haida Gwaii page

1986 sculptures
Bronze sculptures in Canada
Bronze sculptures in Washington, D.C.
First Nations culture
Outdoor sculptures in Washington, D.C.
Sculptures of mythology
Sculptures of women in Washington, D.C.
Statues in Canada
Vancouver International Airport
Haida Gwaii